Maharaja Shri Sir Jitendra Narayan Bhup Bahadur  (20 December 1886 – 20 December 1922) was the Maharaja of Cooch-Behar, India, from September 1913 until his death in December 1922.

Early life

Jitendra Narayan was the second son of Nripendra Narayan and Suniti Devi of Cooch Behar. Victor Nitindra Narayan Bhup Bahadur was his younger brother, the third son of Maharaja Nripendra Narayan and Maharani Suniti Devi. 
He was married to Indira Raje, who was the daughter of Maharaja Sayajirao Gaekwad III and Maharani Chimnabai of Baroda State. He was father of two sons Jagaddipendra Narayan,  Indrajitendra Narayan and three daughters, Ila Devi,  Gayatri Devi and Menaka Devi. His first cousin was Raja Jaladhar Bose of Chitranjan and Rupnarayanpur.

Work

He established Nripendra Narayan Memorial High School in the year 1916.

Cricket

He played one first-class cricket match, for his own side, scoring 33 runs in total.

References

1886 births
1922 deaths
Bengali Hindus
20th-century Bengalis
Hindu monarchs
Indian cricketers
Maharajas of Koch Bihar
Knights Commander of the Order of the Star of India
Indian knights
Founders of Indian schools and colleges
Indian educators
20th-century Indian educators
Educationists from India
Educators from West Bengal
Cricketers from West Bengal
People from Cooch Behar